The Syracuse Orange women's lacrosse is an NCAA Division I college lacrosse team representing Syracuse University as part of the Atlantic Coast Conference. They play their home games at the Carrier Dome in Syracuse, New York.

Historical statistics
*Statistics through 2018 season

Individual career records

Reference:

Individual single-season records

Seasons
Reference:

Postseason Results
The Orange have appeared in 17 NCAA tournaments. Their postseason record is 21-17.

References

 
Atlantic Coast Conference women's lacrosse